No. 231 Squadron RAF was a squadron of the Royal Air Force between 1918 and 1946, active in both World War I and World War II in various roles.

History

First World War
No. 231 Squadron was formed from Nos. 329 and 330 Flights of the seaplane station at the Seaplane Experimental Station at Royal Naval Air Station Felixstowe on 20 August 1918 and flew anti-submarine patrols for the remaining months of the war. On 7 July 1919 it was disbanded.

Second World War

As an army co-operation squadron
On 1 July 1940, No. 231 reformed from No. 416 Flight at RAF Newtownards as an army co-operation squadron equipped with Westland Lysanders. In addition to taking part in exercises with the Army, it flew patrols along the border with Éire. In September 1941 conversion to Curtiss Tomahawks began, but a flight of Lysanders was retained until July 1943. In March 1943 the squadron moved to Yorkshire but left a detachment in Ulster until July, and in April North American Mustangs began to arrive. By the time No. 231 joined No. 128 Airfield of Second TAF on 22 July 1943, it was fully equipped with Mustangs, this type having flown the squadron's first offensive operations on 4 July. Shipping and weather reconnaissance missions, defensive patrols and ground attack sorties over northern France were flown until the squadron disbanded on 15 January 1944.

In the transport and communications role

On 8 September 1944, No. 231 reformed at Dorval, Canada, from No. 45 Group Communications Squadron. No. 45 Group RAF's main task was the ferrying of U.S. and Canadian built aircraft across the Atlantic. It also administrated trans-Atlantic passenger and freight services and No. 231's Coronado flying boats operated between North America, West Africa and the UK, using Largs as its British terminal. Other flights were flown with landplanes, using several of the types available to No. 45 Group as required. In September 1945 the squadron moved to Bermuda, where it disbanded on 15 January 1946. 

On 1 December 1945, a flight was formed to train Avro Lancastrian crews at RAF Full Sutton but its task was taken over by the station when No. 231 disbanded, the Lancastrian Flight becoming the Lancastrian Training Unit/No 1699 HCU. Although it was allotted the squadron number on 16 January 1946, training ceased on 28 March 1946.

Insignia
There is no official insignia noted for this squadron.  There is however a black-and-white photograph of an unofficial insignia affixed to an entry dated 30 March 1942 in the Pilots Log Book of Kenneth Oliver Peachey.
The insignia is of a light coloured horse leaping over a fence from right to left.  This is superimposed over a 3 leaf clover.  A motto "in hoc signo vinces" appears under the insignia, which would translate as "In this sign you will conquer".

Aircraft operated 

From September 1944 the squadron operated various different transport aircraft from Dorval:
Douglas Dakota(1944–1946)
Lockheed Hudson IIIA (1944–1946)
Lockheed Hudson VI (1944–1945)
Consolidated Liberator I, II and II (1944–1946)
Consolidated Coronado (1944–1946)
Spartan Executive (1944–1945)
Martin Marauder(1944–1945)
C-87 Liberator Express (1945–1946)

See also
 List of Royal Air Force aircraft squadrons

References

Citations

Bibliography
 Halley, James J. The Squadrons of the Royal Air Force & Commonwealth 1918-1988. Tonbridge, Kent, UK: Air Britain (Historians) Ltd., 1988. .
 Jefford, C.G. RAF Squadrons, a Comprehensive Record of the Movement and Equipment of all RAF Squadrons and their Antecedents since 1912. Shrewsbury, Shropshire, UK: Airlife Publishing, 2001. .
 Peachey, K.O. RAF Pilot's Flying Log Book, R.C.A.F Form r.95 (R.A.F 414) 13M-10-40 (7786) H.Q. 1062-3-78
 Rawlings, John D.R. Coastal, Support and Special Squadrons of the RAF and their Aircraft. London: Jane's Publishing, 1982. .

Further reading

External links

 
 History of No.'s 231–235 Squadrons at RAF Web

Military units and formations established in 1918
231 Squadron
Aircraft squadrons of the Royal Air Force in World War II
Military units and formations disestablished in 1946
1918 establishments in the United Kingdom